Freeh may refer to:

 Louis Freeh (born 1950), former FBI Director
 Freeh Group International Solutions, consulting firm founded by Louis Freeh
 Freeh Group Europe, affiliated European subsidiary
 "Freeh Report", a report on the Penn State child sex abuse scandal authored by Louis Freeh
 Mazyad Freeh (born 1989), Saudi football player
 Siri Freeh (born 1989), American former beauty pageant winner